USS Lady Thorne (SP-962) was a United States Navy patrol vessel in commission from 1917 to 1918.

Lady Thorne was built as a private motorboat of the same name in 1908. On 22 June 1917, the U.S. Navy acquired her from her owner, R. C. Lamb of Elizabeth City, North Carolina, for use as a section patrol boat during World War I. She was enrolled in the Naval Coast Defense Reserve and commissioned as USS Lady Thorne (SP-962).

Assigned to the 5th Naval District, Lady Thorne served on patrol duties for the next several months.

Lady Thorne was decommissioned on 1 March 1918 and returned to Lamb the same day.

Notes

References

SP-962 Lady Thorne at Department of the Navy Naval History and Heritage Command Online Library of Selected Images: U.S. Navy Ships -- Listed by Hull Number: "SP" #s and "ID" #s -- World War I Era Patrol Vessels and other Acquired Ships and Craft numbered from SP-900 through SP-999
NavSource Online: Section Patrol Craft Photo Archive Lady Thorne (SP 962)

Patrol vessels of the United States Navy
World War I patrol vessels of the United States
1908 ships